College of Advanced Technology (CAT) is an engineering college in Roorkee,  Uttarakhand, India. It is affiliated to Uttarakhand Board of School Education, Roorkee.

Campus 

The campus is spread over 5 acres of land. The CAT campus is home to it hundreds of full-time students from all over the region. It provides all the essential amenities of an urban campus.
Facilities include several labs, workshop, engineering drawing hall, computer lab, class room, library and canteen.

Departments and centres 

5 Departments in this institute:
Mechanical Engineering
Mechanical Engineering (Auto)
Civil Engineering
Electrical Engineering
Electronics Engineering

Award in Uttarakhand 

The prestigious award of "Visionary of Uttarakhand" was presented to Mr. Ruchir Gupta (Chairman - College of Advanced Technology Roorkee) by Hon'able Chief Minister of Uttarakhand for this great contribution in Education.

References

College of Advanced Technology Roorkee, Alumni Association 
Engineering colleges in Uttarakhand
Education in Roorkee
Educational institutions in India with year of establishment missing